Scandentia is an order of small mammals. Members of this order are called scandentians, or treeshrews. They are primarily found in Southeast Asia, with the Madras treeshrew instead in mainland India. They range in size from the Bornean smooth-tailed treeshrew, at  plus a  tail, to the striped treeshrew, at  plus a  tail. They generally live in forests, and primarily eat insects and fruit. No population estimates have been made for any scandentian species, though the Nicobar treeshrew is categorized as endangered.

The twenty-three extant species of Scandentia are grouped into two families: Tupaiidae, which contains twenty-two species within three genera, and Ptilocercidae, which contains a single species, the pen-tailed treeshrew. Only a few extinct scandentian species have been discovered, though due to ongoing research and discoveries the exact number and categorization is not fixed.

Conventions

Conservation status codes listed follow the International Union for Conservation of Nature (IUCN) Red List of Threatened Species. Range maps are provided wherever possible; if a range map is not available, a description of the scandentian's range is provided. Ranges are based on the IUCN Red List for that species unless otherwise noted. All extinct species or subspecies listed alongside extant species went extinct after 1500 CE, and are indicated by a dagger symbol "".

Classification
The order Scandentia consists of two families: Tupaiidae, which contains twenty-two species within three genera, and Ptilocercidae, which contains a single species. Many of these species are further subdivided into subspecies. This does not include hybrid species or extinct prehistoric species.

Family Ptilocercidae
Genus Ptilocercus (pen-tailed treeshrew): one species

Family Tupaiidae
Genus Anathana (Madras treeshrew): one species
Genus Dendrogale (smooth-tailed treeshrews): two species
Genus Tupaia (treeshrews): nineteen species

Scandentians
The following classification is based on the taxonomy described by Mammal Species of the World (2005), with augmentation by generally accepted proposals made since using molecular phylogenetic analysis.

Family Ptilocercidae

Family Tupaiidae

References

Sources

 
 
 
 
 
 
 

 
Scandentians
Scandentians